This list contains a list of EC numbers for the third group, EC 3, hydrolases, placed in numerical order as determined by the Nomenclature Committee of the International Union of Biochemistry and Molecular Biology. All official information is tabulated at the website of the committee. The database is developed and maintained by Andrew McDonald.

EC 3.1: Acting on Ester Bonds

EC 3.1.1: Carboxylic Ester Hydrolases
 : carboxylesterase
 : arylesterase
 : triacylglycerol lipase
 : phospholipase A2
 : lysophospholipase
 : acetylesterase
 : acetylcholinesterase
 : cholinesterase
 EC 3.1.1.9: deleted, a side reaction of  cholinesterase
 : tropinesterase
 : pectinesterase
 EC 3.1.1.12: deleted, identical with  carboxylesterase
 : sterol esterase
 : chlorophyllase
 : L-arabinonolactonase
 : gluconolactonase
 EC 3.1.1.18: deleted, Now included with  gluconolactonase
 : uronolactonase
 : tannase
 : hydroxybutyrate-dimer hydrolase
 : acylglycerol lipase
 : 3-oxoadipate enol-lactonase
 : 1,4-lactonase
 : galactolipase
 : 4-pyridoxolactonase
 : acylcarnitine hydrolase
 : aminoacyl-tRNA hydrolase
 : D-arabinonolactonase
 : 6-phosphogluconolactonase
 : phospholipase A1
 : 6-acetylglucose deacetylase
 : lipoprotein lipase
 : dihydrocoumarin hydrolase
 : limonin-D-ring-lactonase
 : steroid-lactonase
 : triacetate-lactonase
 : actinomycin lactonase
 : orsellinate-depside hydrolase
 : cephalosporin-C deacetylase
 : chlorogenate hydrolase
 : α-amino-acid esterase
 : 4-methyloxaloacetate esterase
 : carboxymethylenebutenolidase
 : deoxylimonate A-ring-lactonase
 : 1-alkyl-2-acetylglycerophosphocholine esterase
 : fusarinine-C ornithinesterase
 : sinapine esterase
 : wax-ester hydrolase
 : phorbol-diester hydrolase
 : phosphatidylinositol deacylase
 : sialate O-acetylesterase
 : acetoxybutynylbithiophene deacetylase
 : acetylsalicylate deacetylase
 : methylumbelliferyl-acetate deacetylase
 : 2-pyrone-4,6-dicarboxylate lactonase
 : N-acetylgalactosaminoglycan deacetylase
 : juvenile-hormone esterase
 : bis(2-ethylhexyl)phthalate esterase
 : protein-glutamate methylesterase
 : 11-cis-retinyl-palmitate hydrolase
 : retinoid isomerohydrolase
 : L-rhamnono-1,4-lactonase
 : 5-(3,4-diacetoxybut-1-ynyl)-2,2′-bithiophene deacetylase
 : fatty-acyl-ethyl-ester synthase
 : xylono-1,4-lactonase
 EC 3.1.1.69: Now , N-acetylglucosaminylphosphatidylinositol deacetylase
 : cetraxate benzylesterase
 : acetylalkylglycerol acetylhydrolase
 : acetylxylan esterase
 : feruloyl esterase
 : cutinase
 : poly(3-hydroxybutyrate) depolymerase
 : poly(3-hydroxyoctanoate) depolymerase
 : acyloxyacyl hydrolase
 : polyneuridine-aldehyde esterase
 : hormone-sensitive lipase
 : acetylajmaline esterase
 : quorum-quenching N-acyl-homoserine lactonase
 : pheophorbidase
 : monoterpene ε-lactone hydrolase
 : cocaine esterase
 : pimelyl-(acyl-carrier protein) methyl ester esterase
 : rhamnogalacturonan acetylesterase
 : fumonisin B1 esterase
 : pyrethroid hydrolase
 : protein phosphatase methylesterase-1
 : all-trans-retinyl ester 13-cis isomerohydrolase
 : 2-oxo-3-(5-oxofuran-2-ylidene)propanoate lactonase
 : 4-sulfomuconolactone hydrolase
 : mycophenolic acid acyl-glucuronide esterase
 : versiconal hemiacetal acetate esterase *	 
 : aclacinomycin methylesterase *	 
 : D-aminoacyl-tRNA deacylase *	 
 : methylated diphthine methylhydrolase *	 
 : [Wnt protein] O-palmitoleoyl-L-serine hydrolase *	 
 : 6-deoxy-6-sulfogluconolactonase *	 
 : chlorophyllide a hydrolase *	 
 : poly(ethylene terephthalate) hydrolase *	 
 : mono(ethylene terephthalate) hydrolase *	 
 : teichoic acid D-alanine hydrolase *	 
 : 5-phospho-D-xylono-1,4-lactonase *	 
 : 3-O-acetylpapaveroxine carboxylesterase *	 
 : O-acetyl-ADP-ribose deacetylase *	 
 : apo-salmochelin esterase *	 
 : iron(III)-enterobactin esterase *	 
 : iron(III)-salmochelin esterase *	 
 : xylono-1,5-lactonase *	 
 : phosphatidylserine sn-1 acylhydrolase *	 
 : isoamyl acetate esterase *	 
 : ethyl acetate hydrolase *	 
 : methyl acetate hydrolase *	 
 : D-apionolactonase *	 
 : sn-1-specific diacylglycerol lipase *	 
 : (4-O-methyl)-D-glucuronate—lignin esterase *	 
 : phospholipid sn-1 acylhydrolase *	
 *No Wikipedia article

EC 3.1.2: Thioester Hydrolases
 : acetyl-CoA hydrolase
 : palmitoyl-CoA hydrolase
 : succinyl-CoA hydrolase
 : 3-hydroxyisobutyryl-CoA hydrolase
 : hydroxymethylglutaryl-CoA hydrolase
 : hydroxyacylglutathione hydrolase
 : glutathione thiolesterase
 EC 3.1.2.8: Now included with  hydroxyacylglutathione hydrolase	 
 EC 3.1.2.9: S-acetoacetylhydrolipoate hydrolase deleted
 : formyl-CoA hydrolase
 : acetoacetyl-CoA hydrolase
 : S-formylglutathione hydrolase
 : S-succinylglutathione hydrolase
 : oleoyl-[acyl-carrier-protein] hydrolase
 : citrate lyase deacetylase
 : (S)-methylmalonyl-CoA hydrolase
 : ADP-dependent short-chain-acyl-CoA hydrolase
 : ADP-dependent medium-chain-acyl-CoA hydrolase
 : acyl-CoA hydrolase
 : dodecanoyl-(acyl-carrier-protein) hydrolase
 : palmitoyl[protein] hydrolase
 : 4-hydroxybenzoyl-CoA thioesterase
 EC 3.1.2.24: transferred entry now , 2′-hydroxybiphenyl-2-sulfinate desulfinase.
 : phenylacetyl-CoA hydrolase
 EC 3.1.2.26: Now , bile acid CoA transferase
 : choloyl-CoA hydrolase
 : 1,4-dihydroxy-2-naphthoyl-CoA hydrolase
 : fluoroacetyl-CoA thioesterase
 : (3S)-malyl-CoA thioesterase *	 
 :	dihydromonacolin L-[lovastatin nonaketide synthase] thioesterase *	 
 : 2-aminobenzoylacetyl-CoA thioesterase *
 *No Wikipedia article

EC 3.1.3: Phosphoric Monoester Hydrolases
 : alkaline phosphatase
 : acid phosphatase
 : phosphoserine phosphatase
 : phosphatidate phosphatase
 : 5′-nucleotidase
 : 3′-nucleotidase
 : 3′(2′),5′-bisphosphate nucleotidase
 : 3-phytase
 : glucose-6-phosphatase
 : glucose-1-phosphatase
 : fructose-bisphosphatase
 : trehalose-phosphatase
 : methylphosphothioglycerate phosphatase
 : histidinol-phosphatase
 : protein serine/threonine phosphatase
 : (phosphorylase) phosphatase
 : phosphoglycolate phosphatase
 : glycerol-2-phosphatase
 : phosphoglycerate phosphatase
 : glycerol-1-phosphatase
 : mannitol-1-phosphatase
 : sugar-phosphatase
 : sucrose-phosphatase
 : inositol-phosphate phosphatase
 : 4-phytase
 : phosphatidylglycerophosphatase
 : ADP-phosphoglycerate phosphatase
 : N-acylneuraminate-9-phosphatase
 EC 3.1.3.30: The activity may be that of an acid phosphatase
 EC 3.1.3.31: The activity may be that of an acid phosphatase
 : polynucleotide 3′-phosphatase
 : polynucleotide 5′-phosphatase
 : deoxynucleotide 3′-phosphatase
 : thymidylate 5′-phosphatase
 : phosphoinositide 5-phosphatase
 : sedoheptulose-bisphosphatase
 : 3-phosphoglycerate phosphatase
 : streptomycin-6-phosphatase
 : guanidinodeoxy-scyllo-inositol-4-phosphatase
 : 4-nitrophenylphosphatase
 : glycogen-synthase-D] phosphatase
 : [pyruvate dehydrogenase (acetyl-transferring)]-phosphatase
 : [acetyl-CoA carboxylase]-phosphatase
 : 3-deoxy-manno-octulosonate-8-phosphatase
 : fructose-2,6-bisphosphate 2-phosphatase
 : [hydroxymethylglutaryl-CoA reductase (NADPH)]-phosphatase
 : protein-tyrosine-phosphatase
 : [pyruvate kinase]-phosphatase
 : sorbitol-6-phosphatase
 : dolichyl-phosphatase
 : [3-methyl-2-oxobutanoate dehydrogenase (2-methylpropanoyl-transferring)]-phosphatase
 : [myosin-light-chain] phosphatase
 : fructose-2,6-bisphosphate 6-phosphatase
 : caldesmon-phosphatase
 : inositol-polyphosphate 5-phosphatase
 : inositol-1,4-bisphosphate 1-phosphatase
 : sugar-terminal-phosphatase
 : alkylacetylglycerophosphatase
 : phosphoenolpyruvate phosphatase
 EC 3.1.3.61: deleted, as its existence has not been established
 : multiple inositol-polyphosphate phosphatase
 : 2-carboxy-D-arabinitol-1-phosphatase
 : phosphatidylinositol-3-phosphatase
 : phosphatidylinositol-3,4-bisphosphate 4-phosphatase
 : phosphatidylinositol-3,4,5-trisphosphate 3-phosphatase
 : 2-deoxyglucose-6-phosphatase
 : glucosylglycerol 3-phosphatase
 : mannosyl-3-phosphoglycerate phosphatase
 : 2-phosphosulfolactate phosphatase
 : 5-phytase
 : adenosylcobalamin/α-ribazole phosphatase
 : pyridoxal phosphatase
 : phosphoethanolamine/phosphocholine phosphatase
 : lipid-phosphate phosphatase
 : acireductone synthase
 : phosphatidylinositol-4,5-bisphosphate 4-phosphatase
 : mannosylfructose-phosphate phosphatase
 : 2,3-bisphosphoglycerate 3-phosphatase
 EC 3.1.3.81: Transferred entry, now , diacylglycerol diphosphate phosphatase
 : D-glycero-β-D-manno-heptose 1,7-bisphosphate 7-phosphatase
 : D-glycero-α-D-manno-heptose 1,7-bisphosphate 7-phosphatase
 : 5′′-phosphoribostamycin phosphatase
 * No Wikipedia article

EC 3.1.4: Phosphoric Diester Hydrolases
 : phosphodiesterase I
 : glycerophosphocholine phosphodiesterase
 : lecithinase C
 : phospholipase D
 EC 3.1.4.5: Now , deoxyribonuclease I
 EC 3.1.4.6: Now , deoxyribonuclease II
 EC 3.1.4.7: Now , micrococcal nuclease
 EC 3.1.4.8: Now , ribonuclease T1
 EC 3.1.4.9: Now , Serratia marcescens nuclease
 EC 3.1.4.10: Now , phosphatidylinositol diacylglycerol-lyase
 : phosphoinositide phospholipase C
 : sphingomyelin phosphodiesterase
 : serine-ethanolaminephosphate phosphodiesterase
 : [acyl-carrier-protein] phosphodiesterase
  : transferred to EC 2.7.7.89, adenylyl-[glutamateammonia ligase] phosphorylase
 : 2′,3′-cyclic-nucleotide 2′-phosphodiesterase
 : 3′,5′-cyclic-nucleotide phosphodiesterase
 EC 3.1.4.18: Now , spleen exonuclease
 EC 3.1.4.19: Now , oligonucleotidase
 EC 3.1.4.20: Now , exoribonuclease II
 EC 3.1.4.21: Now , Aspergillus nuclease S1
 EC 3.1.4.22: Now , pancreatic ribonuclease
 EC 3.1.4.23: Now , ribonuclease T2
 EC 3.1.4.24: deleted
 EC 3.1.4.25: Now , exodeoxyribonuclease I
 EC 3.1.4.26: deleted
 EC 3.1.4.27: Now , exodeoxyribonuclease III
 EC 3.1.4.28: Now , exodeoxyribonuclease (lambda-induced)
 EC 3.1.4.29: deleted
 EC 3.1.4.30: Now , deoxyribonuclease IV (phage-T4-induced)
 EC 3.1.4.31: Now 
 EC 3.1.4.32: deleted
 EC 3.1.4.33: deleted
 EC 3.1.4.34: deleted
 : 3′,5′-cyclic-GMP phosphodiesterase
 EC 3.1.4.36: Now with 
 : 2′,3′-cyclic-nucleotide 3'-phosphodiesterase
 : glycerophosphocholine cholinephosphodiesterase
 : alkylglycerophosphoethanolamine phosphodiesterase
 : CMP-N-acylneuraminate phosphodiesterase
 : sphingomyelin phosphodiesterase D
 : glycerol-1,2-cyclic-phosphate 2-phosphodiesterase
 : glycerophosphoinositol inositolphosphodiesterase
 : glycerophosphoinositol glycerophosphodiesterase
 : N-acetylglucosamine-1-phosphodiester α-N-acetylglucosaminidase
 : glycerophosphodiester phosphodiesterase
 EC 3.1.4.47: Now , glycosylphosphatidylinositol diacylglycerol-lyase
 : dolichylphosphate-glucose phosphodiesterase
 : dolichylphosphate-mannose phosphodiesterase
 : glycosylphosphatidylinositol phospholipase D
 : glucose-1-phospho-D-mannosylglycoprotein phosphodiesterase
 : cyclic-guanylate-specific phosphodiesterase
 : 3′,5′-cyclic-AMP phosphodiesterase
 : N-acetylphosphatidylethanolamine-hydrolysing phospholipase D
 : phosphoribosyl 1,2-cyclic phosphate phosphodiesterase *
 : 7,8-dihydroneopterin 2′,3′-cyclic phosphate phosphodiesterase	 
 : phosphoribosyl 1,2-cyclic phosphate 1,2-diphosphodiesterase *
 : RNA 2′,3′-cyclic 3′-phosphodiesterase *	 
 : cyclic-di-AMP phosphodiesterase *	 
 : pApA phosphodiesterase *	 
 : cyclic 2,3-diphosphoglycerate hydrolase *
 *No Wikipedia article

EC 3.1.5: Triphosphoric Monoester Hydrolases
 : dGTPase

EC 3.1.6: Sulfuric Ester Hydrolases
 : arylsulfatase (type I)
 : steryl-sulfatase
 : glycosulfatase
 : N-acetylgalactosamine-6-sulfatase
 EC 3.1.6.5: deleted
 : choline-sulfatase
 : cellulose-polysulfatase
 : cerebroside-sulfatase
 : chondro-4-sulfatase
 : chondro-6-sulfatase
 : disulfoglucosamine-6-sulfatase
 : N-acetylgalactosamine-6-sulfatase
 : iduronate-2-sulfatase
 : N-acetylglucosamine-6-sulfatase
 : N-sulfoglucosamine-3-sulfatase
 : monomethyl-sulfatase
 : D-lactate-2-sulfatase
 : (R)-specific secondary-alkylsulfatase (type III) *
 : S-sulfosulfanyl-L-cysteine sulfohydrolase *	 
 : linear primary-alkylsulfatase *	 
 : branched primary-alkylsulfatase *	 
 *No Wikipedia article

EC 3.1.7: Diphosphoric Monoester Hydrolases
 : prenyl-diphosphatase
 : guanosine-3′,5′-bis(diphosphate) 3′-diphosphatase
 : monoterpenyl-diphosphatase
 : geranylgeranyl diphosphate diphosphatase
 : farnesyl diphosphatase
 EC 3.1.7.7: Now , (–)-drimenol synthase
 : (13E)-labda-7,13-dien-15-ol synthase
 : geranyl diphosphate diphosphatase
 : (+)-kolavelool synthase *
 *No Wikipedia article

EC 3.1.8: Phosphoric Triester Hydrolases
 : aryldialkylphosphatase
 : diisopropyl-fluorophosphatase

EC 3.1.11: Exodeoxyribonucleases Producing 5'-Phosphomonoesters
 : exodeoxyribonuclease I
 : exodeoxyribonuclease III
 : exodeoxyribonuclease (lambda-induced)
 : exodeoxyribonuclease (phage SP3-induced)
 : exodeoxyribonuclease V
 : exodeoxyribonuclease VII
 EC 3.1.11.7: Now , adenosine-5′-diphospho-5′-[DNA] diphosphatase	 
 EC 3.1.11.8: Now , guanosine-5′-diphospho-5′-[DNA] diphosphatase

EC 3.1.13: Exoribonucleases Producing 5'-Phosphomonoesters
 : exoribonuclease II
 : exoribonuclease H
 : oligonucleotidase
 : poly(A)-specific ribonuclease
 : ribonuclease D

EC 3.1.14: Exoribonucleases Producing 3'-Phosphomonoesters
 : yeast ribonuclease

EC 3.1.15: Exonucleases Active with either Ribo- or Deoxyribonucleic Acids and Producing 5'-Phosphomonoesters
 : venom exonuclease

EC 3.1.16: Exonucleases Active with either Ribo- or Deoxyribonucleic Acids and Producing 3'-Phosphomonoesters
 : spleen exonuclease

EC 3.1.21: Endodeoxyribonucleases Producing 5'-Phosphomonoesters
 : deoxyribonuclease I
 : deoxyribonuclease IV
 : type I site-specific deoxyribonuclease
 : type II site-specific deoxyribonuclease
 : type III site-specific deoxyribonuclease
 : CC-preferring endodeoxyribonuclease
 : deoxyribonuclease V
 : T4 deoxyribonuclease II * 
 : T4 deoxyribonuclease IV *	 
 : crossover junction endodeoxyribonuclease *
 *No Wikipedia article

EC 3.1.22: Endodeoxyribonucleases Producing 3'-Phosphomonoesters
 : deoxyribonuclease II
 : Aspergillus deoxyribonuclease K1
 EC 3.1.22.3: now 
 : crossover junction endodeoxyribonuclease
 : deoxyribonuclease X

EC 3.1.23: and EC 3.1.24 now EC 3.1.21.3, EC 3.1.21.4 and EC 3.1.21.5

Deleted sub-subclasses.

EC 3.1.25: Site-Specific Endodeoxyribonucleases Specific for Altered Bases
 : deoxyribonuclease (pyrimidine dimer)
 EC 3.1.25.2: Now , DNA-(apurinic or apyrimidinic site) lyase

EC 3.1.26: Endoribonucleases Producing 5'-Phosphomonoesters
 : Physarum polycephalum ribonuclease
 : ribonuclease α
 : ribonuclease III
 : ribonuclease H
 : ribonuclease P
 : ribonuclease IV
 : ribonuclease P4
 : ribonuclease M5
 : ribonuclease (poly-(U)-specific)
 : ribonuclease IX
 : tRNase Z
 : ribonuclease E
 : retroviral ribonuclease H

EC 3.1.27: Endoribonucleases Producing 3'-Phosphomonoesters
 EC 3.1.27.1: Now , ribonuclease T2}}, since the primary reaction is that of a lyase
 EC 3.1.27.2: Now , Bacillus subtilis ribonuclease}}, since the reaction catalysed is that of a lyase
 EC 3.1.27.3: Now , ribonuclease T1}}, since the primary reaction is that of a lyase
 EC 3.1.27.4: Now , ribonuclease U2}}, since the primary reaction is that of a lyase
 EC 3.1.27.5: Now , pancreatic ribonuclease.
 EC 3.1.27.6: Now , Enterobacter ribonuclease}}, since the primary reaction is that of a lyase
 : ribonuclease F
 : ribonuclease V
 EC 3.1.27.9: Now , tRNA-intron lyase
 EC 3.1.27.10: Now , ribotoxin,

EC 3.1.30: Endoribonucleases Active with either Ribo- or Deoxyribonucleic Acids and Producing 5'-Phosphomonoesters
 : Aspergillus nuclease S1
 : Serratia marcescens nuclease

EC 3.1.31: Endoribonucleases Active with either Ribo- or Deoxyribonucleic Acids and Producing 3'-Phosphomonoesters
 : micrococcal nuclease

EC 3.2: Glycosylases

EC 3.2.1: Glycosidases, i.e. enzymes hydrolysing O- and S-glycosyl compounds
 : α-amylase
 : β-amylase
 : glucan 1,4-α-glucosidase
 : cellulase
 : deleted
 : endo-1,3(4)-β-glucanase
 : inulinase
 : endo-1,4-β-xylanase
 EC 3.2.1.9: deleted
 : oligo-1,6-glucosidase
 : dextranase
 : chitinase
 : polygalacturonase
 EC 3.2.1.16: deleted
 : lysozyme
 : exo-α-sialidase
 EC 3.2.1.19: deleted
 : α-glucosidase
 : β-glucosidase
 : α-galactosidase
 : β-galactosidase
 : α-mannosidase
 : β-mannosidase
 : β-fructofuranosidase
 EC 3.2.1.27: deleted
 : α,α-trehalase
 EC 3.2.1.30: N-acetyl-β-d-glucosaminidase
 : β-glucuronidase
 : endo-1,3-β-xylanase
 : amylo-α-1,6-glucosidase
 : hyaluronoglucosaminidase
 : hyaluronoglucuronidase
 : xylan 1,4-β-xylosidase
 : β-D-fucosidase
 : glucan endo-1,3-β-D-glucosidase
 : α-L-rhamnosidase
 : pullulanase
 : GDP-glucosidase
 : β-L-rhamnosidase
 : glucosylceramidase
 : galactosylceramidase
 : sucrose α-glucosidase
 : α-N-acetylgalactosaminidase
 : α-N-acetylglucosaminidase
 : α-L-fucosidase
 : β-N-acetylhexosaminidase
 : β-N-acetylgalactosaminidase
 : cyclomaltodextrinase
 : non-reducing end α-L-arabinofuranosidase
 : glucuronosyl-disulfoglucosamine glucuronidase
 : isopullulanase
 : glucan 1,3-b-glucosidase
 : glucan endo-1,3-α-glucosidase
 : glucan 1,4-α-maltotetraohydrolase
 : mycodextranase
 : glycosylceramidase
 : 1,2-α-L-fucosidase
 : 2,6-β-fructan 6-levanbiohydrolase
 : levanase
 : quercitrinase
 : galacturan 1,4-a-galacturonidase
 : isoamylase
 : glucan 1,6-α-glucosidase
 : glucan endo-1,2-β-glucosidase
 : xylan 1,3-β-xylosidase
 : licheninase
 : glucan 1,4-β-glucosidase
 : glucan endo-1,6-β-glucosidase
 : L-iduronidase
 : mannan 1,2-(1,3)-α-mannosidase
 : mannan endo-1,4-β-mannosidase
 : fructan β-fructosidase
 : β-agarase
 : exo-poly-α-digalacturonosidas
 : κ-carrageenase
 : glucan 1,3-α-glucosidase
 : 6-phospho-β-galactosidase
 : 6-phospho-β-glucosidase
 : capsular-polysaccharide endo-1,3-α-galactosidase
 : non-reducing end β-L-arabinopyranosidase
 : arabinogalactan endo-β-1,4-galactanase
 EC 3.2.1.90: Deleted, not sufficiently characterised.
 : cellulose 1,4-β-cellobiosidase (non-reducing end)
 : peptidoglycan β-N-acetylmuramidase
 : α,α-phosphotrehalase
 : glucan 1,6-α-isomaltosidase
 : dextran 1,6-α-isomaltotriosidase
 : mannosyl-glycoprotein endo-β-N-acetylglucosaminidase
 : endo-α-N-acetylgalactosaminidase
 : glucan 1,4-α-maltohexaosidase
 : arabinan endo-1,5-α-L-arabinanase
 : mannan 1,4-mannobiosidase
 : mannan endo-1,6-α-mannosidase
 : blood-group-substance endo-1,4-β-galactosidase
 : keratan-sulfate endo-1,4-β-galactosidase
 : steryl-β-glucosidase
 : 3α(S)-strictosidine β-glucosidase
 : mannosyl-oligosaccharide glucosidase
 : protein-glucosylgalactosylhydroxylysine glucosidase
 : lactase
 : endogalactosaminidase
 : 1,3-α-L-fucosidase
 : 2-deoxyglucosidase
 : mannosyl-oligosaccharide 1,2-α-mannosidase
 : mannosyl-oligosaccharide 1,3-1,6-α-mannosidas
 : branched-dextran exo-1,2-α-glucosidase
 : glucan 1,4-α-maltotriohydrolase
 : amygdalin β-glucosidase
 : prunasin β-glucosidase
 : vicianin β-glucosidase
 : oligoxyloglucan β-glycosidase
 : polymannuronate hydrolase
 : maltose-6′-phosphate glucosidase
 : endoglycosylceramidase
 : 3-deoxy-2-octulosonidase
 : raucaffricine β-glucosidase
 : coniferin β-glucosidase
 : 1,6-α-L-fucosidase
 : glycyrrhizin hydrolase
 : endo-α-sialidase
 : glycoprotein endo-α-1,2-mannosidase
 : xylan α-1,2-glucuronosidase
 : chitosanase
 : glucan 1,4-α-maltohydrolase
 : difructose-anhydride synthase
 : neopullulanase
 : glucuronoarabinoxylan endo-1,4-β-xylanase
 : mannan exo-1,2-1,6-α-mannosidase
 EC 3.2.1.138: Now , anhydrosialidase
 : α-glucuronidase
 : lacto-N-biosidase
 : 4-α-D-{(1→4)-α-D-glucano}trehalose trehalohydrolase
 : limit dextrinase
 : poly(ADP-ribose) glycohydrolase
 : 3-deoxyoctulosonase
 : galactan 1,3-β-galactosidase
 : β-galactofuranosidase
 : thioglucosidase
 : β-primeverosidase
 : oligoxyloglucan reducing-end-specific cellobiohydrolase
 : xyloglucan-specific endo-β-1,4-glucanase
 : mannosylglycoprotein endo-β-mannosidase
 : fructan β-(2,1)-fructosidase
 : fructan β-(2,6)-fructosidase
 : xyloglucan-specific endo-processive β-1,4-glucanase
 : oligosaccharide reducing-end xylanase
 : ι-carrageenase
 : α-agarase
 : α-neoagaro-oligosaccharide hydrolase
 : β-apiosyl-β-glucosidase
 : λ-carrageenase
 : 1,6-α-D-mannosidase
 : galactan endo-1,6-β-galactosidase
 : exo-1,4-β-D-glucosaminidase
 : heparanase
 : baicalin-β-D-glucuronidase
 : hesperidin 6-O-α-L-rhamnosyl-β-D-glucosidase
 : protein O-GlcNAcas
 : mannosylglycerate hydrolase
 : rhamnogalacturonan hydrolase
 : unsaturated rhamnogalacturonyl hydrolase
 : rhamnogalacturonan galacturonohydrolase
 : rhamnogalacturonan rhamnohydrolase
 : β-D-glucopyranosyl abscisate β-glucosidase
 : cellulose 1,4-β-cellobiosidase (reducing end)
 : α-D-xyloside xylohydrolase
 : β-porphyranase
 : gellan tetrasaccharide unsaturated glucuronyl hydrolase
 : unsaturated chondroitin disaccharide hydrolase
 : galactan endo-β-1,3-galactanase
 : 4-hydroxy-7-methoxy-3-oxo-3,4-dihydro-2H-1,4-benzoxazin-2-yl glucoside β-D-glucosidase
 : UDP-N-acetylglucosamine 2-epimerase (hydrolysing)
 : UDP-N,N′-diacetylbacillosamine 2-epimerase (hydrolysing)
 : non-reducing end β-L-arabinofuranosidase *	 
 : protodioscin 26-O-β-D-glucosidase *	 
 : (Ara-f)3-Hyp β-L-arabinobiosidase *	 
 : avenacosidase *	 
 : dioscin glycosidase (diosgenin-forming) *	 
 : dioscin glycosidase (3-O-β-D-Glc-diosgenin-forming) *	 
 : ginsenosidase type III *	 
 : ginsenoside Rb1 β-glucosidase *	 
 : ginsenosidase type I *	 
 : ginsenosidase type IV *	 
 : 20-O-multi-glycoside ginsenosidase *	 
 : limit dextrin α-1,6-maltotetraose-hydrolase *	 
 : β-1,2-mannosidase *	 
 : α-mannan endo-1,2-α-mannanase *	 
 : sulfoquinovosidase *	 
 : exo-chitinase (non-reducing end) *	 
 : exo-chitinase (reducing end) *	 
 : endo-chitodextinase *	 
 : carboxymethylcellulase *	 
 : 1,3-α-isomaltosidase *	 
 : isomaltose glucohydrolase *	 
 : oleuropein β-glucosidase *	 
 : mannosyl-oligosaccharide α-1,3-glucosidase *	 
 : glucosylglycerate hydrolase *	 
 : endoplasmic reticulum Man9GlcNAc2 1,2-α-mannosidase *	 
 : endoplasmic reticulum Man8GlcNAc2 1,2-α-mannosidase *	 
 : endo-(1→3)-fucoidanase *	 
 : endo-(1→4)-fucoidanase *	 
 : galactan exo-1,6-β-galactobiohydrolase (non-reducing end) *	 
 : exo β-1,2-glucooligosaccharide sophorohydrolase (non-reducing end) *
 *No Wikipedia article

EC 3.2.2: Hydrolysing N-Glycosyl Compounds
 : purine nucleosidase
 : inosine nucleosidase
 : uridine nucleosidase
 : AMP nucleosidase
 : NAD+ glycohydrolase
 : ADP-ribosyl cyclase/cyclic ADP-ribose hydrolase
 : adenosine nucleosidase
 : ribosylpyrimidine nucleosidase
 : adenosylhomocysteine nucleosidase
 : pyrimidine-5′-nucleotide nucleosidase
 : β-aspartyl-N-acetylglucosaminidase
 : inosinate nucleosidase
 : 1-methyladenosine nucleosidase
 : NMN nucleosidase
 : DNA-deoxyinosine glycosylase
 : methylthioadenosine nucleosidase
 : deoxyribodipyrimidine endonucleosidase
 : ADP-ribosylarginine hydrolase
 : DNA-3-methyladenine glycosylase I
 : DNA-3-methyladenine glycosylase II, MAG1
 : rRNA 'N-glycosylase
 : DNA-formamidopyrimidine glycosylase
 :  ADP-ribosyl-[dinitrogen reductase] hydrolase
 : N-methyl nucleosidase
 : futalosine hydrolase
 : uracil-DNA glycosylase
 : double-stranded uracil-DNA glycosylase
 : thymine-DNA glycosylase
 : aminodeoxyfutalosine nucleosidase * 
 : adenine glycosylase *
 *No Wikipedia article

EC 3.2.3: Hydrolysing S-Glycosyl Compounds

Deleted sub-subclass

EC 3.3: Acting on Ether Bonds

EC 3.3.1: Thioether and trialkylsulfonium hydrolases
 : adenosylhomocysteinase
 : S-adenosyl-L-methionine hydrolase (L-homoserine-forming)

EC 3.3.2: Ether Hydrolases
 : isochorismatase
 : alkenylglycerophosphocholine hydrolase
 EC 3.3.2.3: Now known to comprise two enzymes, microsomal epoxide hydrolase and soluble epoxide hydrolase
 : trans-epoxysuccinate hydrolase
 : leukotriene-A4 hydrolase
 : hepoxilin-epoxide hydrolase
 : limonene-1,2-epoxide hydrolase
 : microsomal epoxide hydrolase
 : soluble epoxide hydrolase
 : cholesterol-5,6-oxide hydrolase
 : oxepin-CoA hydrolase *	 
 : chorismatase *	 
 : 2,4-dinitroanisole O-demethylase *	 
 : trans-2,3-dihydro-3-hydroxyanthranilic acid synthase *
 *No Wikipedia article

EC 3.4: Acting on peptide bonds – Peptidase

EC 3.4.1 α-amino acyl peptide hydrolases (discontinued)
 EC 3.4.1.1: Now , leucyl aminopeptidase
 EC 3.4.1.2: Now , membrane alanyl aminopeptidase
 EC 3.4.1.3: Now , tripeptide aminopeptidase
 EC 3.4.1.4: Now , prolyl aminopeptidase

EC 3.4.2 Peptidyl amino acid hydrolases (discontinued)
 EC 3.4.2.1: Now , carboxypeptidase A
 EC 3.4.2.2: Now , carboxypeptidase B
 EC 3.4.2.3: Now , Gly-Xaa carboxypeptidase

EC 3.4.3: Dipeptide hydrolases (deleted sub-subclass)
 EC 3.4.3.1: Now , cytosol nonspecific dipeptidase
 EC 3.4.3.2: Now , cytosol nonspecific dipeptidase
 EC 3.4.3.3: Now , Xaa-His dipeptidase
 EC 3.4.3.4: Now , Xaa-methyl-His dipeptidase	
 EC 3.4.3.5: Now , membrane alanyl aminopeptidase
 EC 3.4.3.6: Now , cytosol nonspecific dipeptidase
 EC 3.4.3.7: Now , Xaa-Pro dipeptidase

EC 3.4.4 Peptidyl Peptide Hydrolases (discontinued)
 EC 3.4.4.1:  Now , pepsin A
 EC 3.4.4.2:  Now , pepsin B
 EC 3.4.4.3:  Now , chymosin
 EC 3.4.4.4: Now , trypsin
 EC 3.4.4.5:  Now , chymotrypsin
 EC 3.4.4.6:  Now , chymotrypsin
 EC 3.4.4.8:  Now , enteropeptidase
 EC 3.4.4.9:  Now , dipeptidyl-peptidase I
 EC 3.4.4.10:  Now , papain
 EC 3.4.4.11:  Now , chymopapain
 EC 3.4.4.12:  Now , ficain
 EC 3.4.4.13:  Now , thrombin
 EC 3.4.4.14:  Now , plasmin
 EC 3.4.4.15:  Now , renin
 EC 3.4.4.18:  Now , streptopain
 EC 3.4.4.19:  Now , microbial collagenase
 EC 3.4.4.20:  Now , clostripain
 EC 3.4.4.21:  Now , and is an artifact
 EC 3.6.3.12: Now , K+-transporting ATPase
 EC 3.6.3.14: Now , H+-transporting two-sector ATPase
 EC 3.6.3.15: Now , Na+-transporting two-sector ATPase
 EC 3.6.3.16: Now , arsenite-transporting ATPase
 EC 3.6.3.17: Now covered by various ABC-type monosaccharide transporters in sub-subclass EC 7.5.2
 EC 3.6.3.18: Now , ABC-type oligosaccharide transporter
 EC 3.6.3.19: Now , ABC-type maltose transporter
 EC 3.6.3.20: Now , glycerol-3-phosphate-transporting ATPase
 EC 3.6.3.21: Now , ABC-type polar-amino-acid transporter
 EC 3.6.3.22: Now , ABC-type nonpolar-amino-acid transporter
 EC 3.6.3.23: Now , oligopeptide-transporting ATPase
 EC 3.6.3.24: Now , nickel-transporting ATPase
 EC 3.6.3.25: Now , sulfate-transporting ATPase
 EC 3.6.3.26: Now , nitrate-transporting ATPase
 EC 3.6.3.27: Now , ABC-type phosphate transporter
 EC 3.6.3.28: Now , ABC-type phosphonate transporter
 EC 3.6.3.29: Now , molybdate-transporting ATPase
 EC 3.6.3.30: Now , Fe3+-transporting ATPase
 EC 3.6.3.31: Now , polyamine-transporting ATPase
 EC 3.6.3.32: Now , quaternary-amine-transporting ATPase
 EC 3.6.3.33: Now , vitamin B12-transporting ATPase
 EC 3.6.3.35: Now , manganese-transporting ATPase
 EC 3.6.3.36: Now , taurine-transporting ATPase
 EC 3.6.3.37: Now , guanine-transporting ATPase
 EC 3.6.3.38: Now , ABC-type capsular-polysaccharide transporter
 EC 3.6.3.39: Now , lipopolysaccharide-transporting ATPase
 EC 3.6.3.40: Now , teichoic-acid-transporting ATPase
 EC 3.6.3.41: Now , heme-transporting ATPase
 EC 3.6.3.42: Now , β-glucan-transporting ATPase
 EC 3.6.3.43: Now , peptide-transporting ATPase
 EC 3.6.3.44: Now , ABC-type xenobiotic transporter
 EC 3.6.3.46: Now , ABC-type Cd2+ transporter
 EC 3.6.3.47: Now , fatty-acyl-CoA-transporting ATPase
 EC 3.6.3.48: Now  as α-factor-pheromone transporting ATPase
 EC 3.6.3.49: Now , channel-conductance-controlling ATPase
 EC 3.6.3.50: Now , protein-secreting ATPase
 EC 3.6.3.51: Now , mitochondrial protein-transporting ATPase
 EC 3.6.3.52: Now , chloroplast protein-transporting ATPase
 EC 3.6.3.53: Now , Ag+-exporting ATPase
 EC 3.6.3.54: Now , Cu+-exporting ATPase	 
 EC 3.6.3.55: Now , tungstate-importing ATPase

3.6.4: Acting on acid anhydrides to facilitate cellular and subcellular movement
 EC 3.6.4.1: Now , myosin ATPase
 EC 3.6.4.2: Now , dynein ATPase
 EC 3.6.4.3: Now , microtubule-severing ATPase
 EC 3.6.4.4: Now , plus-end-directed kinesin ATPase
 EC 3.6.4.5: Now , minus-end-directed kinesin ATPase
 : vesicle-fusing ATPase
 : peroxisome-assembly ATPase
 EC 3.6.4.8: Now , proteasome ATPase
 EC 3.6.4.9: Now , chaperonin ATPase
 : non-chaperonin molecular chaperone ATPase
 EC 3.6.4.11: Deleted, the activity has been shown not to take place
 : DNA helicase
 : RNA helicase

3.6.5: Acting on GTP to facilitate cellular and subcellular movement
 : heterotrimeric G-protein GTPase
 : small monomeric GTPase
 : protein-synthesizing GTPase
 : signal-recognition-particle GTPase
 : dynamin GTPase
 : tubulin GTPase

EC 3.7: Acting on carbon-carbon bonds

EC 3.7.1: In ketonic substances
 : oxaloacetase
 : fumarylacetoacetase
 : kynureninase
 : phloretin hydrolase
 : acylpyruvate hydrolase
 : acetylpyruvate hydrolase
 : β-diketone hydrolase
 : 2,6-dioxo-6-phenylhexa-3-enoate hydrolase
 : 2-hydroxymuconate-semialdehyde hydrolase
 : cyclohexane-1,3-dione hydrolase
 : cyclohexane-1,2-dione hydrolase
 : cobalt-precorrin 5A hydrolase
 : 2-hydroxy-6-oxo-6-(2-aminophenyl)hexa-2,4-dienoate hydrolase
 : 2-hydroxy-6-oxonona-2,4-dienedioate hydrolase
 EC 3.7.1.15: Now , (+)-caryolan-1-ol synthase
 EC 3.7.1.16: Now , oxepin-CoA hydrolase
 : 4,5:9,10-diseco-3-hydroxy-5,9,17-trioxoandrosta-1(10),2-diene-4-oate hydrolase
 : 6-oxocamphor hydrolase
 : 2,6-dihydroxypseudooxynicotine hydrolase
 : 3-fumarylpyruvate hydrolase
 : 6-oxocyclohex-1-ene-1-carbonyl-CoA hydratase *	 
 : 3D-(3,5/4)-trihydroxycyclohexane-1,2-dione acylhydrolase (ring-opening)	 
 :  maleylpyruvate hydrolase *	 
 : 2,4-diacetylphloroglucinol hydrolase *	 
 : 2-hydroxy-6-oxohepta-2,4-dienoate hydrolase *	 
 : 2,4-didehydro-3-deoxy-L-rhamnonate hydrolase *	 
 : neryl diphosphate diphosphatase *	 
 : 3-oxoisoapionate-4-phosphate transcarboxylase/hydrolase *
 *No Wikipedia article

EC 3.8: Acting on halide bonds

EC 3.8.1: Acting on halide bonds
 : (S)-2-haloacid dehalogenase
 : haloacetate dehalogenase
 EC 3.8.1.4: Now , thyroxine 5′-deiodinase
 : haloalkane dehalogenase
 : 4-chlorobenzoate dehalogenase
 : 4-chlorobenzoyl-CoA dehalogenase
 : atrazine chlorohydrolase
 : (R)-2-haloacid dehalogenase
 : 2-haloacid dehalogenase (configuration-inverting)
 : 2-haloacid dehalogenase (configuration-retaining)

3.8.2: In phosphorus-halide compounds (deleted sub-subclass)
 EC 3.8.2.1: Now , diisopropyl-fluorophosphatase

EC 3.9: act on phosphorus-nitrogen bonds

EC 3.9.1: Acting on phosphorus-nitrogen bonds (only sub-subclass identified to date)
 : phosphoamidase
 : protein arginine phosphatase *
 : phosphohistidine phosphatase *
 *No Wikipedia article

EC 3.10: Acting on sulfur-nitrogen bonds

EC 3.10.1: Acting on sulfur-nitrogen bonds (only sub-subclass identified to date)
 : N-sulfoglucosamine sulfohydrolase
 : cyclamate sulfohydrolase

EC 3.11: Acting on carbon-phosphorus bonds

EC 3.11.1: Acting on carbon-phosphorus bonds (only sub-subclass identified to date)
 : phosphonoacetaldehyde hydrolase
 : phosphonoacetate hydrolase
 : phosphonopyruvate hydrolase

EC 3.12: Acting on sulfur-sulfur bonds

EC 3.12.1: Acting on sulfur-sulfur bonds (only sub-subclass identified to date)
 : trithionate hydrolase

EC 3.13: Acting on carbon-sulfur bonds

EC 3.13.1: Acting on carbon-sulfur bonds (only sub-subclass identified to date)
 : UDP-sulfoquinovose synthase
 : 2′-hydroxybiphenyl-2-sulfinate desulfinase
 : 3-sulfinopropanoyl-CoA desulfinase *
 : carbon disulfide hydrolase
 : [CysO sulfur-carrier protein]-S-L-cysteine hydrolase *
 : Carbonyl sulfide hydrolase
 : S-adenosyl-L-methionine hydrolase (adenosine-forming *
 : S-inosyl-L-homocysteine hydrolase *
 *No Wikipedia article

References

EC3